The ALCO S-2 and S-4 were  diesel electric switchers produced by ALCO and Canadian licensee Montreal Locomotive Works (MLW).

Powered by turbocharged, 6-cylinder ALCO 539 diesel engines, the two locomotives differed mainly in their trucks: the S-2 had ALCO "Blunt" trucks; the S-4, AAR type A switcher trucks. A total of 1,502 S-2s were built from August 1940 to June 1950; 797 S-4s were built from June 1949 to August 1957. The S-4 was first produced in Canada, with ALCO production beginning in June 1949. 

The S-2 and S-4 were designed as rail yard switchers, meant to replace older, less efficient, and more demanding steam switchers. They were a success, with many remaining in service today.

The locomotives' exterior was styled by ALCO engineer Ray Patten, who used curves in a mild application of Art Deco principles. 

The S-2 and S-4 are distinguishable externally from the very similar S-1 and S-3 660 hp (492 kW) switchers in that they have a larger exhaust stack with an oblong base and a larger radiator shutter area on the nose sides. The S-1/S-3 radiator shutter area is taller than it is wide, while the S-2/S-4 radiator area is wider. The larger stack is due to turbocharging. The carbody and cab of late S-2s are nearly indistinguishable from those of S-4s. Hence, a truck swap can cause many to misidentify a unit.

Survivors
A few S-2s and S-4s are still in service on short line railroads around the United States.  Several more are preserved in U.S. and Canadian railroad museums.

Operable 

Conrad Yelvington Distributors, an aggregate supplier in Orlando, Florida, owns and operates six S-2 locomotives and one S-4 locomotive. The S-2's include former C&O 5029, B&O 516 Ontario Northland 1202 and 1201, and Seaboard Air Lane 1428 and 1431. They are now Conrad Yelvington locomotives 224, 238, 239, 251, 317, and 366, respectively.  The S-4, formerly C&O 5105, is now Conrad Yelvington locomotive 365.

The Oil Creek and Titusville Railroad operates S-2s #75 and #85 on its tourist/freight railroad.

The Toledo, Lake Erie, and Western owns three ALCO S-2 locomotives and one ALCO S-4. TLEW 62, a S-2 purchased in 2012, ex. Delray Cement 62, TLEW 112, a S-2 that was part of the original TLEW roster, now reduced to a parts unit as of 2010, TLEW 5109, a S-4, and the only operating ALCO on the line currently. 5109 recently was repainted into its original Chesapeake and Ohio colors in September 2013.

An ALCO S-2 built in 1946 was serving the Columbia & Reading Railway as #2-26 in Columbia, Pennsylvania, during 2019 after first operating on the C&O as #5015 and later on six other railroads.

The North Alabama Railroad Museum in Huntsville, Alabama runs one S-2 in regular tourist excursions, Mercury & Chase #213. It also owns another S-2, Mercury & Chase #484, which returned to service with #213 in 2018.  The museum also has ex-Santa Fe #1534, an ALCO S-4 that is not in service.

The San Francisco Bay Railroad, the short-line railroad for the Port of San Francisco, operates S-2s #23 and #25 from the San Francisco Belt Line Railroad.

An S-2 of D&RGW heritage survives on the Big South Fork Scenic Railway, as number 102. It was purchased in February 1964 for the Kentucky and Tennessee Railway, and is in operable condition in Stearns, Kentucky. This was one of the diesels that replaced Southern 2-8-2 #4501 on the K&T.

Southern Pacific 1474 is in operation, in rotation, at the Orange Empire Railway Museum in Perris, California, pulling a tourist train on weekends.

The Cooperstown and Charlotte Valley Railroad operates a pair of restored ex-Canadian National units S-4 #3051 (formerly CN #8181) and S-7 #3052 (formerly CN #8223). In 2017, they acquired the former Concord and Claremont Railroad ALCO S-4 units S-4 #102 (formerly D&H #3050) and S-4 #104 (formerly D&H #3036). As of 2020, all but #104 were operational on the tourist passenger and maintenance of way services between Milford and Cooperstown, New York. S-7 #3052 is thought to be the last S-7 built that is still in operation. 

The coal-hauling Beech Mountain Railroad in Alexander, West Virginia, rosters an S-2 (#113) and an S-4 (#115). Both were built new for Michigan Limestone and Chemical Company.

The Minnesota, Dakota and Western Railway operates five S-2 locomotives, MD&W 16, 17, 18, 19, and 20, which were formerly B&O 512, Y&N 220, Toledo Terminal 103, B&O 500, and Northern Pacific 716, respectively.

In the mid-1960s, Hamersley Iron purchased an S-2 for use in the Pilbara region of Western Australia.

Other 
Baltimore and Ohio Railroad 9115 has been cosmetically restored at the West Chester Railroad. In 2022 it was repainted to its original B&O paint scheme. It is not currently in service

Western Pacific 563, one of two S-4s purchased by that railroad, is today preserved at the Western Pacific Railroad Museum at Portola, California.

Erie Railroad S-2 518 is at The Meadville Railroad Depot Museum.

New York, Susquehanna and Western Railway S-2 #206 sits cosmetically restored at Maywood Station in Maywood, New Jersey.

In Muskogee, Oklahoma, at the Three Rivers Museum, a S-2 #63-138 sits behind the Midland Valley Station.

The Houston Railroad Museum in Houston, Texas, has two S-2s: ex-Santa Fe #2350 and ex-Houston Belt and Terminal #14.

The Gold Coast Railway Museum possesses NASA S-2 #1, which was used to switch freight at NASA's Kennedy Space Center.

See also
List of ALCO diesel locomotives
List of MLW diesel locomotives

References

Dorin, Patrick C. (1972). Chicago and North Western Power. Burbank, California: Superior Publishing. p. 136. ISBN 0-87564-715-4.
Pinkepank, Jerry A. (1973). The Second Diesel Spotter's Guide. Kalmbach Publishing Co., Milwaukee, WI. p. 224. ISBN 0-89024-026-4.
Toppan, Andrew et al. Alco/MLW S-2 Roster. Retrieved on 29 December 2005.
Toppan, Andrew et al. Alco/MLW S-4 Roster. Retrieved on 29 December 2005.
Steinbrenner, Richard T. (2003). The American Locomotive Company: A Centennial Remembrance. On Track Publishers LLC, New Brunswick, NJ. ISBN 0-911122-07-9.

S-02 and S-4
B-B locomotives
Diesel locomotives of the United States
Diesel locomotives of Western Australia
S-02 and S-4
Railway locomotives introduced in 1949
Railway locomotives introduced in 1940
Standard gauge locomotives of Canada
Standard gauge locomotives of the United States
Standard gauge locomotives of Mexico
Standard gauge locomotives of Australia
Diesel-electric locomotives of Australia
Diesel-electric locomotives of Canada
Diesel-electric locomotives of Mexico
Diesel-electric locomotives of the United States